Omero Antonutti (3 August 1935 – 5 November 2019) was an Italian actor and voice actor.

Biography
Born in Basiliano, in the province of Udine (in the Northeastern Italian region of Friuli-Venezia Giulia), after having worked in shipyards Antonutti embraced the acting career, working mainly on stage, especially at the Teatro Stabile di Trieste and at the Teatro Stabile di Genova, in which he often worked under Luigi Squarzina. He made his film debut in the 1966 film Pleasant Nights starring Vittorio Gassman, Gina Lollobrigida and Ugo Tognazzi. His most notable performance was in the Taviani brothers' acclaimed film Padre Padrone. In Spain, he worked with Víctor Erice in El Sur, and Carlos Saura in El Dorado. He also played Noah in Genesis: The Creation and the Flood.

Antonutti was also regularly employed in the dubbing of foreign films into the Italian language. He was the official Italian voice actor of Christopher Lee and dubbed many of his film roles, which include The Lord of the Rings film franchise, The Hobbit film franchise and Star Wars: Episode III – Revenge of the Sith. Other actors he dubbed included John Hurt, Omar Sharif, Michael Gambon, Christopher Plummer, Donald Sutherland, James Cromwell and Robert Duvall.

Death
Antonutti died in Udine on 5 November 2019, at the age of 84, after suffering a long cancer-related illness.

Filmography

Cinema

Pleasant Nights (1966) – Il Capitano
Black Market of Love (1966) – Lemaire
Processo per direttissima (1974) – il commissario Messina
The Sunday Woman (1975) – Benito
Padre Padrone (1977) – Efisio Ledda
Alexander the Great (1980) – Alexandros
The Night of the Shooting Stars (1982) – Galvano
Grog (1982) – Enrico
The South (1983) – Agustín Arenas
Quartetto Basileus (1983) – Diego
Il disertore (1983) – Don Coi
Kaos (1984) – Luigi Pirandello
Good Morning, Babylon (1987) – Bonanno
El Dorado (1988) – Lope de Aguirre
The Witches' Sabbath (1988) – Medico condotto
Bankomatt (1989) – Ernesto Soldini
Sandino (1990) – Don Gregorio Sandino
Una storia semplice (1991) – Father Cricco
Amor e Dedinhos de Pé (1992) – Padilla
The Fencing Master (1992) – Don Jaime Astarloa
Farinelli (1994) – Nicola Porpora
Un eroe borghese (1995) – Michele Sindona
The Border (1996) – Simeone
Tierra del fuego (2000)
The Bankers of God: The Calvi Affair (2002) – Roberto Calvi
Napoleon and Me (2006) – Master Fontanelli
The Girl by the Lake (2007) – Mario's father
Miracle at St. Anna (2008) – Ludovico Salducci
Piazza Fontana: The Italian Conspiracy (2012) – Giuseppe Saragat
Welcome Mr. President (2013) – General Secretary Ranieri
Burning Love (2015) – Leonardo's grandfather
Hammamet (2020) – Craxi's father (posthumous release)

Television
The Life of Verdi (1982)
El rey y la reina (1986)
Genesis: The Creation and the Flood (1994)
 Il Pirata: Marco Pantani (2007)

Dubbing roles

Animation
Russ Cargill in The Simpsons Movie
Mr. Rzykruski in Frankenweenie
Noah in Noah's Ark
Number 1 in 9
Narrator in The Man Who Planted Trees

Live action
Saruman in The Lord of the Rings: The Fellowship of the Ring
Saruman in The Lord of the Rings: The Two Towers
Saruman in The Lord of the Rings: The Return of the King
Saruman in The Hobbit: An Unexpected Journey
Saruman in The Hobbit: The Battle of the Five Armies
Sir Richard Turkel in Tale of the Mummy 
Burgomaster in Sleepy Hollow
Count Dooku in Star Wars: Episode III – Revenge of the Sith
Cardinal D'Ambroise in Season of the Witch
Silas Clarney in Dark Shadows
Bob Gerson in Space Cowboys
William Randolph Hearst in RKO 281
John Adams Gates in National Treasure
Henrik Vanger in The Girl with the Dragon Tattoo
Walter in Wrestling Ernest Hemingway
Boss Spearman in Open Range
Monsieur Ibrahim in Monsieur Ibrahim
King George V in The King's Speech
Adam Sutler in V for Vendetta
Reverend Monroe in Cold Mountain
Nigel Honeycutt in Fool's Gold
Sul in City of Ember
Esteban Vihaio in Kill Bill: Volume 2
Charles Brice in The Accompanist
Narrator in Scary Movie 4
Narrator in Epic Movie
Narrator in 10,000 BC
Delfinello in The Knights of the Quest
Marion Post's father in Another Woman
Alvin Straight / Lyle Straight in The Straight Story

Video games
Saruman in The Lord of the Rings: The Two Towers
Saruman in The Lord of the Rings: The Battle for Middle-earth
Saruman in The Lord of the Rings: The Third Age

References

External links

1935 births
2019 deaths
People from Basiliano
Italian male film actors
Italian male voice actors
Italian male stage actors
Italian male television actors
Italian male video game actors
20th-century Italian male actors
21st-century Italian male actors
Deaths from cancer in Friuli Venezia Giulia